Double Exposure is the third release by drummer/pianist/composer Joe Chambers. It is a duo album featuring Larry Young on Hammond organ and synthesizer. It was recorded in 1977 and released on the Muse label.

Reception

In his review for AllMusic, Scott Yanow stated "The music is somewhat adventurous with Chambers as the lead voice on the numbers on which he plays piano; the final two performances are organ-drum duets that put more of an emphasis on Young's unique sound. This interesting session has some surprising music."

The song "Mind Rain" was prominently sampled in the Nas song "N.Y. State of Mind" off his critically acclaimed debut album Illmatic.

Track listing
All compositions by Joe Chambers except as indicated
 "Hello to the Wind" - 8:50	
 "The Orge" (Larry Young) - 5:30	
 "Mind Rain" - 9:00
 "After the Rain" - 4:30
 "Message from Mars" (Young) - 6:07
 "Rock Pile" - 5:50

Personnel
Joe Chambers - piano (tracks 1-4), electric piano (track 2), tabla, (track 2), cymbal (tracks 2 & 3), drums (tracks 5 & 6)
Larry Young - organ (tracks 1-3, 5 & 6), synthesizer (track 2)

References

1978 albums
Joe Chambers albums
Muse Records albums